The burgstall of Unterailsfeld Castle is the site of a medieval lowland castle situated at a height of  in the village of Unterailsfeld, in the market municipality of Gößweinstein in the county of Forchheim in the south German state of Bavaria.

In 1525 its owners were named as the lords of Eyb. The castle was destroyed during the Peasants' War.

No above ground ruins of the old castle have survived.

Literature 
 
 Hellmut Kunstmann: Die Burgen der östlichen Fränkischen Schweiz. Aus der Reihe: Veröffentlichungen der Gesellschaft für Fränkische Geschichte Reihe IX: Darstellungen aus der Fränkischen Geschichte, Vol. 20. Kommissionsverlag Degener und Co., Neustadt/Aisch, 1965, pp. 183–185.

External links 
 

Castles in Bavaria
Gößweinstein